The arrondissement of Lyon is an arrondissement of France in the Auvergne-Rhône-Alpes region. It has 135 communes.

Composition

The communes of the arrondissement of Lyon are:

 Albigny-sur-Saône (69003)
 Ampuis (69007)
 Aveize (69014)
 Beauvallon (69179)
 Brignais (69027)
 Brindas (69028)
 Bron (69029)
 Brullioles (69030)
 Brussieu (69031)
 Cailloux-sur-Fontaines (69033)
 Caluire-et-Cuire (69034)
 Chabanière (69228)
 Chambost-Longessaigne (69038)
 Champagne-au-Mont-d'Or (69040)
 La Chapelle-sur-Coise (69042)
 Chaponnay (69270)
 Chaponost (69043)
 Charbonnières-les-Bains (69044)
 Charly (69046)
 Chassieu (69271)
 Chaussan (69051)
 Coise (69062)
 Collonges-au-Mont-d'Or (69063)
 Colombier-Saugnieu (69299)
 Communay (69272)
 Condrieu (69064)
 Corbas (69273)
 Couzon-au-Mont-d'Or (69068)
 Craponne (69069)
 Curis-au-Mont-d'Or (69071)
 Dardilly (69072)
 Décines-Charpieu (69275)
 Duerne (69078)
 Échalas (69080)
 Écully (69081)
 Feyzin (69276)
 Fleurieu-sur-Saône (69085)
 Fontaines-Saint-Martin (69087)
 Fontaines-sur-Saône (69088)
 Francheville (69089)
 Genas (69277)
 Genay (69278)
 Givors (69091)
 Grézieu-la-Varenne (69094)
 Grézieu-le-Marché (69095)
 Grigny (69096)
 Les Haies (69097)
 Les Halles (69098)
 Haute-Rivoire (69099)
 Irigny (69100)
 Jonage (69279)
 Jons (69280)
 Larajasse (69110)
 Limonest (69116)
 Lissieu (69117)
 Loire-sur-Rhône (69118)
 Longes (69119)
 Longessaigne (69120)
 Lyon (69123)
 Marcy-l'Étoile (69127)
 Marennes (69281)
 Messimy (69131)
 Meys (69132)
 Meyzieu (69282)
 Millery (69133)
 Mions (69283)
 Montagny (69136)
 Montanay (69284)
 Montromant (69138)
 Montrottier (69139)
 Mornant (69141)
 La Mulatière (69142)
 Neuville-sur-Saône (69143)
 Orliénas (69148)
 Oullins (69149)
 Pierre-Bénite (69152)
 Poleymieux-au-Mont-d'Or (69153)
 Pollionnay (69154)
 Pomeys (69155)
 Pusignan (69285)
 Quincieux (69163)
 Rillieux-la-Pape (69286)
 Riverie (69166)
 Rochetaillée-sur-Saône (69168)
 Rontalon (69170)
 Saint-André-la-Côte (69180)
 Saint-Bonnet-de-Mure (69287)
 Saint-Clément-les-Places (69187)
 Saint-Cyr-au-Mont-d'Or (69191)
 Saint-Cyr-sur-le-Rhône (69193)
 Saint-Didier-au-Mont-d'Or (69194)
 Sainte-Catherine (69184)
 Sainte-Colombe (69189)
 Sainte-Consorce (69190)
 Sainte-Foy-l'Argentière (69201)
 Sainte-Foy-lès-Lyon (69202)
 Saint-Fons (69199)
 Saint-Genis-l'Argentière (69203)
 Saint-Genis-Laval (69204)
 Saint-Genis-les-Ollières (69205)
 Saint-Germain-au-Mont-d'Or (69207)
 Saint-Laurent-d'Agny (69219)
 Saint-Laurent-de-Chamousset (69220)
 Saint-Laurent-de-Mure (69288)
 Saint-Martin-en-Haut (69227)
 Saint-Pierre-de-Chandieu (69289)
 Saint-Priest (69290)
 Saint-Romain-au-Mont-d'Or (69233)
 Saint-Romain-en-Gal (69235)
 Saint-Romain-en-Gier (69236)
 Saint-Symphorien-d'Ozon (69291)
 Saint-Symphorien-sur-Coise (69238)
 Sathonay-Camp (69292)
 Sathonay-Village (69293)
 Sérézin-du-Rhône (69294)
 Simandres (69295)
 Solaize (69296)
 Soucieu-en-Jarrest (69176)
 Souzy (69178)
 Taluyers (69241)
 Tassin-la-Demi-Lune (69244)
 Ternay (69297)
 Thurins (69249)
 La Tour-de-Salvagny (69250)
 Toussieu (69298)
 Trèves (69252)
 Tupin-et-Semons (69253)
 Vaugneray (69255)
 Vaulx-en-Velin (69256)
 Vénissieux (69259)
 Vernaison (69260)
 Villechenève (69263)
 Villeurbanne (69266)
 Vourles (69268)
 Yzeron (69269)

History

The arrondissement of Lyon was created in 1800. On 1 January 2015, 101 communes that did not join the newly created Metropolis of Lyon passed from the arrondissement of Lyon to the arrondissement of Villefranche-sur-Saône. On 1 February 2017, 78 communes passed from the arrondissement of Villefranche-sur-Saône to the arrondissement of Lyon.

As a result of the reorganisation of the cantons of France which came into effect in 2015, the borders of the cantons are no longer related to the borders of the arrondissements. The cantons of the arrondissement of Lyon were, as of January 2015:

 L'Arbresle
 Bron
 Caluire-et-Cuire
 Condrieu
 Décines-Charpieu
 Écully
 Givors
 Irigny
 Limonest
 Lyon-I
 Lyon-II
 Lyon-III
 Lyon-IV
 Lyon-V
 Lyon-VI
 Lyon-VII
 Lyon-VIII
 Lyon-IX
 Lyon-X
 Lyon-XI
 Lyon-XII
 Lyon-XIII
 Lyon-XIV
 Meyzieu
 Mornant
 Neuville-sur-Saône
 Oullins
 Rillieux-la-Pape
 Sainte-Foy-lès-Lyon
 Saint-Fons
 Saint-Genis-Laval
 Saint-Laurent-de-Chamousset
 Saint-Priest
 Saint-Symphorien-d'Ozon
 Saint-Symphorien-sur-Coise
 Tassin-la-Demi-Lune
 Vaugneray
 Vaulx-en-Velin
 Vénissieux-Nord
 Vénissieux-Sud
 Villeurbanne-Centre
 Villeurbanne-Nord
 Villeurbanne-Sud

References

Lyon